Salvatore Bibbo (born 24 August 1974) is an English former footballer who played as a goalkeeper. He was the goalkeeping coach at Arsenal.

Playing career 
Born in Basingstoke, Bibbo made one appearance for his hometown club in December 1992 against St. Albans City. He had a spell at Crawley Town but did not make an appearance before moving to Sheffield United in August 1993. He made just two appearances for the Blades over three years and was loaned out to Chesterfield and Northern Irish side Ards. Bibbo joined Reading in 1996 and made nine appearances for the side over two seasons before moving into non-league football due to a back injury. He joined Havant & Waterlooville in 1999 and made 36 appearances during his first and only season with the club. On 9 July 2000 he joined fellow Southern League Premier Division side Bath City on a one-year contract. He made 45 appearances in all competitions but left at the end of the season due to budget constraints and retired from playing in 2004.

Coaching career 
Following his retirement Bibbo rejoined former side Reading as a goalkeeping coach on an initial part-time basis before signing full-time in 2006. He signed a new 12-month rolling contract in June 2010 and has also coached at the Nike Academy.

From the summer of 2019, Bibbo also became the goalkeeper coach of Arsenal's U-23 team.

References

External links
Sal Bibbo profile at Reading F.C.

1974 births
Living people
Sportspeople from Basingstoke
English footballers
Association football goalkeepers
Basingstoke Town F.C. players
Crawley Town F.C. players
Sheffield United F.C. players
Chesterfield F.C. players
Ards F.C. players
Reading F.C. players
Havant & Waterlooville F.C. players
Bath City F.C. players
English Football League players
English people of Italian descent
NIFL Premiership players
Isthmian League players
Southern Football League players
Reading F.C. non-playing staff
Arsenal F.C. non-playing staff
Footballers from Hampshire